IJET may mean:

International Journal of Educational Technology, a peer-reviewed journal about Educational Technology
International Japanese-English Translation Conference, annual conference organized by the Japan Association of Translators
A brand of Independence Air